Phosphatidylinositol 4-kinase beta is an enzyme that in humans is encoded by the PI4KB gene.

Classification 

This gene encodes a phosphatidylinositol 4-kinase which catalyzes phosphorylation of phosphatidylinositol at the D-4 position, yielding phosphatidylinositol 4-phosphate (PI4P). Besides the fact, that PI4P serves as a precursor for other important phosphoinositides, such as phosphatidylinositol 4,5-bisphosphate, PI4P is an essential molecule in the cellular signaling and trafficking especially in the Golgi apparatus and the trans Golgi network.

Phosphatidylinositol 4-kinases are evolutionary conserved among eukaryotes and include four human isoforms
 phosphatidylinositol 4-kinase alpha (PI4KA)
 phosphatidylinositol 4-kinase beta (PI4KB)
 phosphatidylinositol 4-kinase 2-alpha (PI4K2A)
 phosphatidylinositol 4-kinase 2-beta (PI4K2B)

Function 

Phosphatidylinositol 4-kinase beta (PI4KB) is a soluble protein shuttling between the cytoplasm and the nucleus, and can be recruited to the membranes of the Golgi system via protein-protein interactions, e.g. with small GTP binding proteins Arf1 and Rab11, or a Golgi adaptor protein ACBD3. PI4KB can be phosphorylated by the protein kinase D, which promotes the interaction with 14-3-3 proteins and stabilization of the protein in its active conformation. In cytoplasm PI4KB regulates the trafficking from the Golgi system to the plasma membrane, nevertheless, its nuclear function remains to be determined.

Clinical significance 

A wide range of positive-sense single-stranded RNA viruses (e.g. picornaviruses) including many important human pathogens hijack human PI4KB kinase to generate specific PI4P-enriched organelles called membranous webs. These organelles are then used as specific platforms for the effective viral replication within the host cell.

Furthermore, PI4KB homologue from the protozoan parasite Plasmodium falciparum has been identified as a target of imidopyrazines, an antimalarial compound class.

Structure 

PI4KB is composed of a proline-rich N-terminal region, a central helical domain, and a kinase domain located C-terminally. The N-terminal region contains a physiologically important binding site for a Golgi adaptor protein ACBD3, but is likely disordered and dispensable for the kinase activity. The central helical domain is responsible for the interaction with a small guanosine triphosphatase Rab11. The kinase domain can be divided into N-terminal and C-terminal lobes with the ATP binding groove and putative phosphatidylinositol binding pocket in a cleft between the lobes. In addition, an ALPS motif has been identified in the extreme C-terminal region of PI4KB, which favors its association with unsaturated or loosely packed membranes regions.

References

Further reading